Hyehwa Station is a station on the Seoul Subway Line 4 in Jongno-gu, Seoul. It is located in the center of the area commonly known as Daehangno, and much of the ridership of this station comes from the nightlife scene. The Seoul National University Yongon campus, housing its Hospital and School of Medicine, is located to the southwest.

The station was the center of the 2018-2019 Hyehwa Station protest to rally against discrimination of women and spy camera crimes.

Station layout

Vicinity
Exit 1 : The Holy Spirit Campus of the Catholic University of Korea, Dongseong Middle & High Schools
Exit 2 : Marronnier Park, Korean National Open University
Exit 3 : Seoul National University Hospital & Yeongeon Campus (Medical School)
Exit 4 : Sungkyunkwan University, Changgyeonggung, Seoul Science High School, Hansung University Design campus

See also 

 Hyehwa Station Protest

References

Metro stations in Jongno District
Seoul Metropolitan Subway stations
Railway stations in South Korea opened in 1985